Mukul Niketon High School is a private school in Mymensingh District, Bangladesh. The school is located at 10, Moharaza Road which is few minutes walk from Mymensingh Rail Station. It is very close to Mymensingh Central Masque. Lately, new administration and academic high rise buildings have been developed to increase lab facility and to improve classroom environment.

One of the attracting features of the school is participating in cultural and extra-curricular activities including debate, essay writing, articles, art, etc. and games and sports (soccer, cricket, chess, etc.). Every year a large number of students take the SSC examinations. Quite often, the number of SSC candidates is more than 500. The School participated in National TV School debate  for the first time in 1992 led by Muhammad Moniruzzaman. The school became champion in Nirman School Cricket Championship and players of the school took training from abroad.

The school plays important role at any kind of natural disaster and national problems. The teachers and students of the school also donated, collected and delivered foods, clothes and other essentials to the flood affected people at 1988 and 1998.

References

High schools in Bangladesh
Educational institutions established in 1970